Colin O'Brien (born 2000) is an Irish hurler who plays for club side Liscarroll Churchtown Gaels and at inter-county level with the Cork senior hurling team. He usually lines out as a forward.

Career

O'Brien first came to prominence at juvenile and underage levels with the Liscarroll Churchtown Gaels combination. He first appeared on the inter-county scene as a corner-forward on the Cork under-17 team that won the one-off All-Ireland Under-17 Championship in 2017. O'Brien was also a member of the Cork minor team that lost the 2017 All-Ireland minor final to Galway. He progressed onto the unde-20 team and won an All-Ireland Under-20 Championship title in 2020. O'Brien joined the Cork senior hurling team as a member of the extended training panel in 2021 and made his debut against Offaly in the 2022 National League.

Career statistics

Honours

Cork
 All-Ireland Under-20 Hurling Championship: 2020
 Munster Under-20 Hurling Championship: 2020
 Munster Minor Hurling Championship: 2017
 All-Ireland Under-17 Hurling Championship: 2017
 Munster Under-17 Hurling Championship: 2017

References

2000 births
Living people
Liscarroll/Churchtown Gaels hurlers
Cork inter-county hurlers